The Ambassador of Mexico to the United States is the highest ranking diplomatic representative of the United Mexican States to the United States of America.

Brief history
Mexico and the United States have maintained diplomatic relations since 12 December 1822. The first Mexican legation was composed by just four members:
José Manuel Zozaya, envoy extraordinary and minister plenipotentiary, former attorney-in-fact (in ) of Agustín de Iturbide.
José Anastasio Torrens, secretary, a former officer in the army of José María Morelos who was a close friend of José Manuel de Herrera and had studied in the United States.
Francisco de Paula Tamariz, attaché and translator.
Ignacio de Villaseñor y Cervantes, a Roman Catholic chaplain. According to historian Jorge Flores, this was a curious choice, and he was probably selected simply because they anticipated the lack of religious services in Spanish.
The first street address registered by the group when President James Monroe conferred diplomatic recognition on 12 December 1822 was the Strother's Hotel, on Pennsylvania Avenue and 14th street. The hotel, owned by John Tayloe III, was managed by John Strother from 1818 to 1824 and eventually became the Willard Hotel. The legation, however, lacked enough funds to settle in Washington, D.C., and had to rent a property in Philadelphia.

List of diplomatic representatives
The following list includes every head of the legation recognized by Mexican Secretariat of Foreign Affairs. Since this is an official list, there are some omissions, such as Emeterio de la Garza, Jr., a special representative of Victoriano Huerta who tried to secure recognition for its administration between 1913–1914.

See also
Mexico–United States relations
Embassy of Mexico, Washington, D.C.

References

 
Lists of ambassadors to the United States
United States